Xtra-vision was an online video, film and music store in the Republic of Ireland and Northern Ireland operated by Hilco Ireland.

The company original was Ireland's largest chain of DVR/DVD/Blu-ray rental stores and entertainment retailing company, founded in 1979 by Richard Murphy. It was previously operated by US company Blockbuster. Starting in 2013, 26 stores in Ireland were trading as HMV/Xtra-vision, offering many of the same items as the bigger HMV stores. On 27 January 2016, Xtra-vision was liquidated and ceased trading. The company then operated as an online business and operated rental vending machines across the Republic of Ireland until its closure in 2021.

History

Xtra-vision was founded by Richard Murphy in 1979. At its peak, it operated over 200 stores across both Ireland and Northern Ireland. Xtra-vision went into financial difficulties in the 1990s. Their books overestimated the value of their video stock in stores . The company went into receivership and was bought by businessman Peter O'Grady Walshe who later sold on the company to US giant Blockbuster.

The chain was run by Blockbuster from 1996. The chain never rebranded, citing market research that the Xtra-vision name was better known and more respected than Blockbuster. Even in Northern Ireland the Blockbuster name was not used as it is in the rest of the UK. The few Xtra-vision stores outside Ireland — those in Manchester, London and New Hampshire, were rebranded to Blockbuster after the takeover.

The company was involved in what was once Ireland's largest corporate insolvency, with massive expansion of their retail network causing a massive increase in their stock price on the Irish Stock Exchange. The company's value reached IR£27 million, but the low turnovers in the video rental market meant that there was no cash to continue their huge expansion — up to 10 new stores a week — and the company became insolvent with its shares valued at 1/8 of a penny on its sale to Cambridge Investments, who in turn went bankrupt and the business was sold for IR£12m to a consortium of Montague Private Equity, 3i, and the partners behind NCV (a local wholesaler of videos, etc.). Less than 2 years later the consortium sold out to Blockbuster. The failure of the group, in both guises, was notable enough to be mentioned in Dáil debates in 1994.

The company has an exclusive deal meaning that any movie with funding from the Irish Film Board will initially be provided for rental and sale solely through their network of stores.

In August 2009, Blockbuster sold off its Irish operations to Birchhall Investments. In May 2011 the company went into examinership but successfully exited in August.

2009 Halo 3 Tournament

On October 20, 2009, as a promotion for the upcoming release of Halo 3: ODST, Xtra-vision ran a Halo 3 tournament, in which they held 2 categories, Teams and Doubles, Teams being a 4 player team and Doubles being a 2 player team, in which they would compete in an all Ireland tournament, the winners receiving a free copy of Halo 3: ODST. The campaign turned out a great success, boosting publicity for Xtra-vision and the release of Halo 3: ODST. The winners of the Teams being "Team Axios", a Halo team from County Mayo, and the winner of the Doubles being Dan Vaughan and Marcus Conaghey.

Receivership and sale to Hilco
On 29 April 2013, the company announced that it was to enter receivership with Luke Charleton and Colin Farquharson, of Ernst & Young. On 7 May 2013, the receivers announced that 20 stores will close throughout Ireland with a  loss of up to 120 jobs. These stores were closed due to trading losses because of fall in revenue. Xtra-vision was sold to Hilco Capital Ireland in June 2013 for an undisclosed sum. On 30 August 2013, Hilco announced that 26 Xtra-vision stores would be dual-branded with HMV).

In January 2016, the high court appointed a provisional liquidator to Xtra-vision after the company became insolvent and unable to pay their debts, most of the 580 jobs expected to be lost. The company now operates as an online business, selling Movies, Video Games and Electronics. Xtra-Vision also operates many vending machines across SuperValu, petrol stations and shopping centres.

Xbox One release controversy
When the Xbox One was released in November 2013, Xtra-vision gained negative media attention due to their policy of forcing customers who had pre-ordered the console to purchase an additional game in order to get their console. After media attention and backlash on social media websites, Ireland's National Consumer Agency launched an investigation into Xtra-vision's practices. Xtra-vision reversed this policy, and announced that refunds were available for those who had purchased an additional game with their pre-ordered console.

Xtra-Vision Xpress 

Xtra-Vision operates many vending machines across the Republic of Ireland in SuperValu stores, petrol station and shopping centres. New movies are added every Friday. Blu-Rays, DVDs and Video Games are available at vending machines.

On 7 July 2021, Xtra-Vision Xpress was placed into voluntary liquidation.

How it works 
The customer selects the movies and games that they wish to rent. No subscription is required, however if the customer wishes a receipt, an e-mail must be provided. Payment is taken from debit/credit card. The movie has to be returned by 8pm on the return date (between 1-3 nights depending on amount of discs rented - as stated above). If not returned the fee is €1.50 daily, up to a maximum of 10 days (€15). After 10 days, the disc is customer's to keep.

References

https://www.bbc.co.uk/news/uk-northern-ireland-35421088

External links
 Xtra-vision
 Xtra-Vision Xpress

Retail companies established in 1979
Retail companies disestablished in 2021
Companies based in Dublin (city)
Video rental services
Former Viacom subsidiaries
Irish companies established in 1979
2021 disestablishments in Ireland